Ras al-Ayn Subdistrict  is a subdistrict of Ras al-Ayn District in western al-Hasakah Governorate, northeastern Syria. The administrative centre is the city of Ras al-Ayn. In 1907, Mark Sykes mentioned a nomadic Kurdish tribe called the Sartan living near Ras al-Ayn.

At the 2004 census, the subdistrict had a population of 121,536.

Cities, towns and villages

References 

Ras al-Ayn District
Ras al-Ayn